This is a list of the discography of Daniel Johnston, who lived in Austin, Texas.

Handmade Cassettes 
Before 'Yip/Jump Music', Johnston's albums were more-so collections of songs he would re-record whenever he wanted to give someone a tape. The standardised versions of these albums were created when Stress Records bought Johnston's back catalog in the mid-1980s. 
 Songs of Pain (Handmade cassette 1981. Standardised version created by Stress Records in 1988)
 Don't Be Scared (Handmade cassette made July 1982. Standardised version created by Stress Records in 1986)
 The What of Whom (Handmade cassette, August 1982)
Ugly Music (Handmade alternate version of Songs of Pain, August 1982)
 Someday You're Gonna Make It, Joe (Lost alternate version of 'More Songs of Pain', February 1983)
 More Songs of Pain (Stress Records cassette, 1983. Standardised version created by Stress Records in 1988)
 Yip/Jump Music (Stress Records cassette, August 1983)
 Hi, How Are You (Stress Records cassette, September 1983)
 Retired Boxer (Stress Records cassette, 1984)
 Respect (Stress Records cassette, January 1985)
Merry Christmas (Stress Records cassette, 1988)

Studio Albums 
 Continued Story (Stress Records cassette, December 1985. Partially studio recordings, partially demos)
1990 (Shimmy Disc, 1990 Partially studio recordings, partially live recordings & demos)
 Artistic Vice (Shimmy Disc, 1991)
 Fun (Atlantic, 1994)
 Rejected Unknown (Gammon Records/Pickled Egg Records, 2001)
 Fear Yourself with Mark Linkous (Gammon Records (USA), Sketchbook Records (UK and Europe), 2003)
 Lost and Found (Sketchbook Records, UK and Europe, 2006)
 Is and Always Was (Eternal Yip Eye Music, 2009)
 Space Ducks (Eternal Yip Eye Music, 2012)

Live albums 
 Live at South by Southwest (Stress Records cassette, 1990)
 Frankenstein Love recorded live in 1992 (Stress Records cassette, 1998)
 Why Me? recorded live at the Volksbühne in Berlin, June 6, 1999 (Trikont, 2000)
 Normal recorded live at the Rochester Opera House in Rochester, NH, May 12 2012 (Teen Arena Records, 2013)
 Live@Albertstudios (Albert Music, 2010)

MP3s, LPs, EPs and singles 

 The River of No Return (1991)
 Big Big World recorded 1986 (Seminal Twang, UK, 1991)
 Laurie (Seminal Twang, UK, 1992)
 Happy Time (1994)
 Dream Scream (Pickled Egg Records, 1998)
 Impossible Love (2001)
 Sinning Is Easy (Pickled Egg Records, 2002)
 Mountain Top (Rough Trade, 2003)
 Fish (Sketchbook Records, UK, 2003)
 Fear Yourself LP Only with Mark Linkous (Coppertree Records UK, Ltd Ed 180g vinyl, 2008)
 Lost and Found LP Only (Coppertree Records UK, Ltd Ed double 180g vinyl, 2008)

Side projects and collaborations 

 with Jad Fair: It's Spooky (50 Skidillion Watts, 1989; reissued on Jagjaguwar, 2001)
 with Yo La Tengo: Speeding Motorcycle single (1990)
 Danny and the Nightmares (Eternal Yip Eye Music, 1999)
 with Ron English and Jack Medicine: Hyperjinx Tricycle (Important Records, 2000)
 with Chris Bultman and Jad Fair as The Lucky Sperms: Somewhat Humorous (Jagjaguwar, 2001)
 Danny and the Nightmares: Natzi single (2001)
 with Hyperjinx Tricycle: Long Lost Love single (2002)
 with Okkervil River: Happy Hearts off the album Don't Fall in Love with Everyone You See (Jagjaguwar, 2002)
 spoken word performance on the track "Love is a fascist invention" on the Alpine Those Myriads album "yr royal jetlag gospel" (Osito Records, 2003) 
 with Hyperjinx Tricycle: Alien Mind Control 3" CD (Important Records, 2003)
 Danny and the Nightmares: The End Is Near Again (Cool Beans, 2003)
 with Rule of Thirds: "Rin Tin Soldier" (Eternal Yip Eye Music, 2003)
 Danny and the Nightmares: Freak Brain (Sympathy Records, 2005)
 with Jack Medicine: The Electric Ghosts (Important Records, 2006)
 Danny and the Nightmares: "Red Hot Sex'''' appears on the Misc. Music Sampler (Misc. Music, 2007) 
 with Kraig Mc Govern and on a live track recorded in Dublin July 2008
 with The Swell Season On January 31, 2009, Austin City Limits (previously recorded on September 28, 2008) to perform the song "Life in Vain"
 with Beam: Beam Me Up! (Hazelwood, 2010)
 Danny and the Nightmares: The Death of Satan (Munster Records, 2013)

 Compilations and tribute albums 

 The Lost Recordings (Stress Records, recorded 1983, released 1992) cassette
 The Lost Recordings II (Stress Records, recorded 1983, released 1992) cassette
 A Texas Trip - contributed two songs (Caroline Records, 1987)
 Please Don't Feed The Ego (Eternal Yip Eye Music, 1994)
 Dead Dog's Eyeball by Kathy McCarty (1994)
 My So-Called Life - contributed "Come See Me Tonight" (1995)
 Schoolhouse Rock! Rocks - contributed "Unpack Your Adjectives" (1996)
 The Early Recordings of Daniel Johnston Volume 1 (Dualtone, 2003) - Reissue of Songs of Pain and More Songs of Pain The Sun Shines Down On Me by Gerry Nobody (2003)
 The Late Great Daniel Johnston: Discovered Covered (Gammon Records, 2004) - Tribute album along with disc of original versions plus one new song
 White Magic: From The Cassette Archives 1979–1989 (Eternal Yip Eye Music, 2004)
 I Killed the Monster: 21 Artists Performing the Songs of Daniel Johnston (2006) - Tribute album featuring contributions from Sufjan Stevens, Mike Watt, Jad Fair and Kimya Dawson
 Apskaft Tribute To Daniel Johnston (The Sound Of Apskaft, 2011) 
 50minutes (EXERCISE1 Recordings, 2006)
 Welcome To My World (Eternal Yip Eye Music, 2006)
 My Yoke Is Heavy: The Songs of Daniel Johnston by Adrian Crowley and James Yorkston (Chemikal Underground, 2013)

 Films 

 The Devil and Daniel Johnston 
 The Angel and Daniel Johnston - Live at the Union Chapel Daniel Johnston at Home LIVE'' recorded live in Waller Texas 1999 (Stephen Tompkins, Digital Download video/mp3 release 2009)

Rock music discographies
Discographies of American artists
Discography